A family wage is a wage that is sufficient to raise a family. This contrasts with a living wage, which is generally taken to mean a wage sufficient for a single individual to live on, but not necessarily sufficient to also support a family. As a stronger form of living wage, a family wage is likewise advocated by proponents of social justice. Family wage campaign was aiming to maintain the traditional family structure, as a concept connecting economics and family structure it is one of the examples of how economic structure of family, which is a subject of the field family economics, affects overall economy beyond the family.

The notion of a family wage traditionally proposes a household consisting of a nuclear family with a single wage-earner, namely the man, with the wife staying home and raising the children, and thus the premise that the man's wage should support his wife and their children. This is in contrast to a multi-generation household, consisting also of the previous generation, or to single parent households or dual-earners. With the entry of women into the paid labor force, this model has been complicated, with some households having two wage earners, some one, and others none; see feminist movement for context and discussion.

History

United States 
The term "family wage jobs" has occasional contemporary use in American political rhetoric and is most associated with Catholic intellectuals, in the Catholic social teaching tradition, such as Douglas Kmiec and Allan C. Carlson. The following is a table with minimum wage vs family wage in the US for families of 4 (2 parents and 2 children) with one of the parents working in 2016:

Charles Krauthammer has said there should be a two-tiered system where breadwinners have a higher minimum wage.

Israel 
A family wage – a basic wage, with a supplement by family size, was adopted by the dominant trade union in the British Mandate of Palestine (now the state of Israel), Histadrut, in 1923, and remained policy for a decade, but implementation was limited.

Portugal 
In Portugal, a family wage was advocated by Francisco Rolão Preto.

Spain 
In Spain, a family wage has been a key plank in the platform of the Confederación Nacional del Trabajo, an influential confederation of labor unions, in accord with the notion of "to each according to their needs".

United Kingdom 
In the United Kingdom, a family wage was a demand of male labour unionists at the turn of the 19th century.

Demographic significance 
If a worker or family does not earn a family wage, they are likely to delay having children and have a smaller family, both due to delayed childbearing and due to choosing to limit number of children due to expense. This has been cited as a factor in decreasing family sizes following urbanization and the industrial revolution in essays dating back to the 1751 Observations Concerning the Increase of Mankind, Peopling of Countries, etc. by Benjamin Franklin.

Further, this leads to differing fertility across income levels, with higher income households (above a family wage) not being as constrained as lower income households.

See also

 Family economics
 Labour law
 Employee benefits
 Maximum wage
 Minimum wage
 Living wage
 Wage slavery
 Employment discrimination
 Wage theft
 Working poor
 Guaranteed minimum income
 Entitlement
 Welfare
 Wages and salaries
 Income distribution
 Household income

References 

 Oxford Dictionary of Sociology: family wage 

Wages and salaries